James Haldane may refer to:

 James Haldane (1768–1851), Scottish religious leader
 James Haldane (footballer) (1890–1915), Scottish footballer
 James Haldane (diplomat) (1692–1742), British soldier and diplomat